Pete Silver & Will McLean are two British architectural practitioners, educators, writers, and technical theorists who work together as a duo. They have taught at the Architectural Association, The Bartlett (University College London), and The University of Westminster's School of Architecture and the Built environment, thus gaining a privileged position in the contemporary London architectural scene.

Background

Will McLean is a Doctor of Philosophy and artist Bruce McLean's son. He trained at the Architectural Association under Will Alsop OBE RA and Professor John Frazer. McLean has worked on a series of projects with Bruce McLean, most notably Dalry Primary School in North Ayrshire completed in 2007 (www.primaryspace.net), and with US architect and artist Adam Kalkin, working on such projects as 'Quik Build' container housing. He has had a regular feature, covering technical innovations, in Architectural Design magazine - McLean's Nuggets, and was an Editor of Construction History - the International Journal of the Construction History Society.
Pete Silver worked for Solon Housing Association in South London with architects such as Patrick Keiller, Edward Cullinan and Walter Segal. He trained at the Architectural Association under Professors John Frazer and Gordon Pask, and became a researcher in the Land Use Research Unit at King's College London, gaining a unique insight into Professor Alice Coleman's ground-breaking, if controversial work on post-war housing regeneration. Silver was for many years a director of the Chartered Practice Architects (CPA) Ltd. and holds a UK patent for a novel type of structural diagrid.

Collaborative career
In 2001, Silver and McLean joined the School of Architecture and the Built environment at the University of Westminster where they jointly head the Technical Studies Department, and co-curate a highly successful public lecture series. 

They have co-authored five architecture books: 

 Fabrication: the designer's guide (Architectural Press);
 Introduction to Architectural Technology (Laurence King Publishing - available in 9 languages);
 Structural Engineering for Architects: A Handbook (Laurence King Publishing, co-authored with engineer Peter Evans - available in 4 languages);
 Air Structures (Laurence King Publishing);
 Environmental Design Sourcebook: Innovative Ideas for a Sustainable Built Environment (RIBA Publications).

Bibliography 
Books
Frazer J.H (1995), An Evolutionary Architecture, Themes VII,  Architectural Association, London, UK. (Contributions by Silver) (out of print but free download at http://www.aaschool.ac.uk/publications/ea/intro.html)
Silver, Pete and McLean, William and Veglio, Simon (2006) Fabrication: the designers guide: the illustrated works of twelve specialist UK fabricators, Architectural Press, Oxford, UK. 
Silver, Pete and McLean, William (2008) An Introduction to Architectural Technology, Laurence King, London, UK  (Second Edition published 2013, Third Edition published 2021)
Silver, Pete and McLean, William and Evans, Peter (2014) Structural Engineering for Architects: A Handbook, Laurence King, London, UK ISBN 978 -1-78067-055-3
McLean, William and Silver, Pete (2015) Air Structures, Laurence King (in the series Form + Technique), London, UK
McLean, William and Silver, Pete (2021) Environmental Design Sourcebook: Innovative Ideas for a Sustainable Built Environment, RIBA Publications, London, UK ISBN 9781859469606
McLean, William (2008) Quik Build: Adam Kalkin’s ABC of Container Architecture, Bibliothèque McLean, London, UK (Also in the series Form + Technique, see: Rivas Adrover, Esther (2015) Deployable Structures, Laurence King, London, UK )
Periodicals
Pete Silver and Peter Fluck (2001) Non-Linear dynamical Systems, In: A.D. Magazine, Architectural Design Profile No 123.	
Silver et al., (2001) Prototypical Applications of Cybernetic Systems in Architectural Contexts, In: Kybernetes, Volume 30 Number 7/8.
McLean, William (2005–2009) McLean's nuggets. In: Architectural Design (various). Wiley, Chichester, UK.
McLean, William and Silver, Pete (2019) AMPS Proceedings 17-2 - Education, Design and Practice – Understanding skills in a Complex World, Technical Skills for Students of Architecture.

Hosted Lectures

The Technical Studies Lectures, hosted by the University of Westminster, offers a platform for the dissemination of ideas from such speakers as those in the following, non-exhaustive list (archived at https://technicalstudies.tumblr.com/):
Simon Allford, Will Alsop, Michael Ashby, Philip Ball, Gianni Botsford, Dave Carr-Smith, Andrew Cripps, Alex De Rijke, John Frazer, Thomas Heatherwick, Richard Horden, Eva Jiricna, Patrick Keiller, Tim Macfarlane, Ben Morris, Martin Pawley, Sergio Pellegrino (James Watt International Medal), Cedric Price, Esther Rivas Adrover, Rupert Sheldrake, Julien Vincent, John Zerning.
Former students include:
Paul Bavister
Jason Bruges
Andrew Whiting
Usman Haque
Chris Leung
Eyal Weizman

References

21st-century English architects
British architecture writers
Architectural theoreticians
Architecture firms based in London
Living people
Year of birth missing (living people)